The Plaza de Oriente is a square in the historic center of Madrid, Spain. Rectangular in shape and monumental in character, it was designed in 1844 by Narciso Pascual y Colomer. The square was propagated by King Joseph I, who ordered the demolition of the medieval houses on the site.

It is located between some important landmarks in Madrid: To the west is the Royal Palace, the Teatro Real ("Royal Theater") to the east, and the Royal Monastery of the Incarnation to the north.

The plaza has statues of 44 Spanish kings from the medieval period, including:
 Alfonso I of Asturias
 Alfonso II of Asturias
 Euric

Buildings around the square
Royal Palace of Madrid
Teatro Real
Royal Monastery of La Encarnación

Monument to Philip IV

At the heart of the Plaza de Oriente lies a monument dedicated to Philip IV of Spain.

Ori